"I Miss You" is a ballad performed by British singer Beverley Craven, from her third album Mixed Emotions.

Details

The song was originally written for the 1996 film The Adventures of Pinocchio, and was written from the point of view of Geppetto after Pinocchio leaves him. The song however was rejected by the film's producers.
 
Eventually, the song was released on her next album Mixed Emotions, and was chosen as the first single. The song was sent to radios as a promotional single when the album was released in May 1999. A commercial release of the single was planned for the end of July, however the label refused to give it a full release, possibly due to the underperformance of the album on the UK charts and all promotion was halted soon afterwards.

The song become a huge radio hit in Poland, peaking #1 on the airplay chart. As a result of this success two more songs from the album, "We Found A Place" and "Say You're Sorry", were released as promo radio singles there.

Video

The music video features Craven playing the piano against a white background and singing the song. The Mixed Emotions album cover was taken from shots of this video.

Track listings

 CD Single
 "I Miss You" 4:35

1999 singles
1990s ballads
Beverley Craven songs
1996 songs
Epic Records singles
Songs written by Beverley Craven